The Hun Sen Cup was the main football knockout tournament in Cambodia. The 2017 Hun Sen Cup was the 11th season of the Hun Sen Cup, the premier knockout tournament for association football clubs in Cambodia involving Cambodian League and provincial teams organized by the Football Federation of Cambodia.

National Defense Ministry were the defending champions, having beaten Preah Khan Reach Svay Rieng 6–5 on penalty shoot-out after 1-1 extra time in the previous season's final.

First round
The 14 teams from provinces of six zones divided into six groups playing in the First round. Each group was played on a home-and-away round-robin basis. Takeo in Group A and Kampot in Group E directed to Second round due to only one team in their groups. Group winners, runners-up, and the best two third-placed teams advanced to the Second round.

Group A

Group B

Group C

Group D

Group E

Group F

Second round

First leg

Second leg

Third round
A total of 18 teams played in this round. The six winners from the second round, the eight teams from Cambodian Second League (except the championship team Kirivong Sok Sen Chey entered the fourth round) and the four teams from Cambodian League played in the third round.
Stung Treng and Oddar Meanchey advanced to the fourth round due to Kampong Speu and Sihanoukville withdrew from the Cup.

First leg

Second leg

Fourth round
A total numbers of 16 teams played in this round. The nine teams (included Stung Treng and Oddar Meanchey) won from the third round, the championship of Cambodian Second League Kirivong Sok Sen Chey and the top six teams of Cambodian League entered the fourth round.

First leg

Second leg

Quarter-finals

First leg

Second leg

Semi-finals

First leg

Second leg

Third place play-off

Final

Awards
 Top goal scorer : Khoun Laboravy of Boeung Ket (16 goals)
 Player of the season : Prak Mony Udom of Preah Khan Reach
 Goalkeeper of the Season : Om Oudom of Preah Khan Reach
 Coach of the season : Sam Vandeth of Preah Khan Reach
 Fair Play: Boeung Ket

See also
 2017 Cambodian League
 2017 Cambodian Second League

References

Hun Sen Cup seasons
2017 in Cambodian football
2017 domestic association football cups